Stigma was an Italian band based in Mondovì.

The group was founded in 2000 and played Metalcore but their musical style changed. Nowadays Stigma plays a mixture of Melodic Death Metal, Deathcore and Grindcore.

Their albums When Midnight Strikes! (2008) and Concierto for the Undead (2010) were released through the US label Pivotal Rockordings. 2010s album Concierto for the Undead  was produced by Bring Me the Horizon guitarist Jona Weinhofen. The Japanese and Australian album version is distributet by Stomp Entertainment. Their digital EP The Undertaker which was produced by Simone Mulanori, Brandan Schieppati (musician of Bleeding Through) and Anaal Nathrakh musician Mick Kenney. Kenney and Shiepati founded Bombs of Death Productions. The cover artwork was designed by Daniel Mcbride who worked together designed covers for acts like Born of Osiris, Veil of Maya and After the Burial.

A music video for the song The Undertaker was directed by Salvatore Perroni who worked together with Devildriver, Suicide Silence, Evergreen Terrace and Adam Kills Eve.

Success 
The 2008s debut album When Midnight Strikes! acclaimed much critics in international music magazines like Metal Hammer, Rock Hard and Legacy. Even Bruce Dickinson singer of Iron Maiden criticized this album on his Airplay (Iron Maiden Airplay) positively.

Stigma played a European tour which ended with a gig at belgish Ieperfest where the group shared stage with Bring Me the Horizon and August Burns Red. In 2010 Stigma played concerts in Hungary and Denmark and shared stage with groups like Amon Amarth, Legion of the Damned, Vader, Eluveitie and Marduk. The group was open act for Bleeding Through who played a gig in Rome on June 15, 2010.

Discography

Demos 
 2003: Metamorphosis (Auto-production)

EPs 
 2005: Epitaph of Pain (Nocturnal Brights)
 2011: The Undertaker (Pivotal Rockordings, digital only)

Albums 
 2008: When Midnight Strikes! (Pivotal Rockordings)
 2010: Concierto for the Undead (Pivotal Rockordings, Stomp Entertainment)

Musicians

Now 
 Stefano "Vlad" Gehrsi - Vocals
 Andrea Bailo - Guitar
 Giacomo "Jack" Poli - Guitar
 Stefano Ghigliano - Drums, Percussion
 Flavio "Magna" Magnaldi - Bass guitar

Former 
 Morgan Ferrua - Guitar
 Davide Garro - Guitar, Live member
 Gabriele Chiarla - Drums
 Matteo Diano - Bass guitar

External links 
 Stigma at MySpace

Musical groups established in 2000
Italian death metal musical groups
Musical groups disestablished in 2012